The 2018 Vanderbilt Commodores football team represented Vanderbilt University in the 2018 NCAA Division I FBS football season. The Commodores played their home games at Vanderbilt Stadium in Nashville, Tennessee and competed in the Eastern Division of the Southeastern Conference (SEC). They were led by fifth-year head coach Derek Mason. Vanderbilt finished the season 6–7, 3–5 in SEC play to finish in 6th place in the East Division. They were invited to play in the Texas Bowl where they were defeated by Baylor.

Previous season
The Commodores finished the 2017 season 5–7, 1–7 in SEC play to finish in sixth place in the Eastern Division.

Recruiting

Position key

Recruits
The Commodores signed a total of 19 recruits.

Preseason

Award watch lists

SEC media poll
The SEC media poll was released on July 20, 2018, with the Commodores predicted to finish last in the East Division.

Schedule

Schedule Source:

Game summaries

Middle Tennessee

Location: Vanderbilt Stadium • Nashville, Tennessee

Nevada

Location: Vanderbilt Stadium • Nashville, Tennessee

at Notre Dame

Location: Notre Dame Stadium • South Bend, Indiana

South Carolina

Location: Vanderbilt Stadium • Nashville, Tennessee

Tennessee State

Location: Vanderbilt Stadium • Nashville, Tennessee

at Georgia

Location: Sanford Stadium • Athens, Georgia

Florida

Location: Vanderbilt Stadium • Nashville, Tennessee

at Kentucky

Location: Kroger Field • Lexington, Kentucky

at Arkansas

Location: Donald W. Reynolds Razorback Stadium • Fayetteville, Arkansas

at Missouri

Location: Faurot Field • Columbia, Missouri

Ole Miss

Location: Vanderbilt Stadium • Nashville, Tennessee

Tennessee

Location: Vanderbilt Stadium • Nashville, Tennessee

Baylor–Texas Bowl

Location: NRG Stadium • Houston, TX

Players drafted into the NFL

References

Vanderbilt
Vanderbilt Commodores football seasons
Vanderbilt Commodores football